Kinzo Taniguchi (born 1910, date of death unknown) was a Japanese cross-country skier. He competed in the men's 50 kilometre event at the 1932 Winter Olympics.

References

1910 births
Year of death missing
Japanese male cross-country skiers
Olympic cross-country skiers of Japan
Cross-country skiers at the 1932 Winter Olympics
People from Sakhalin Oblast
Sportspeople from Sakhalin Oblast